Alan Campbell-Johnson CIE OBE (16 July 1913 – 25 January 1998) was a British Liberal Party politician, journalist, author and public relations consultant. He notably worked on the staff of Sir Archibald Sinclair and served as Press Attaché to Lord Mountbatten as Viceroy of India.

Background
He was the son of James and Gladys Campbell-Johnson. He was educated at Westminster School and Christ Church, Oxford (scholar; BA 2nd Class). Hons Modern History, 1935; MA). He married, in 1938, Imogen Fay de la Tour Dunlap. They had one son and one daughter.

Career
During the 1939–1945 war, Campbell Johnson enlisted in the Royal Air Force Volunteer Reserve in 1941 and received an emergency commission as an acting pilot officer in the Administrative and Special Duties Branch on 20 October. He was regraded pilot officer on 20 December, with promotion to war-substantive flying officer on 1 October 1942. He was promoted war-substantive flight lieutenant on 28 September 1944.

He served on the staff of Lord Mountbatten at Combined Operations Headquarters, S.E.A.C. in the RAF; CO HQ, 1942–43; HQ SACSEA (Wing Comdr i/c Inter-Allied Records Section), 1943–46. He rejoined Mountbatten's staff as Press Attaché when he became Viceroy and Governor-General of India, from 1947 to 1948. He was Chairman of Campbell-Johnson Ltd, Public Relations Consultants, from 1953 to 1978. He was Honorary Fellow of the Institute of Public Relations President from 1956 to 1957. He was Director of Hill and Knowlton (UK) Ltd, from 1976 to 1985. He was Honorary DLitt Southampton in 1990.

Political career
He was Political Secretary to Sir Archibald Sinclair, Leader of the Liberal Party from 1937 to 1940. In 1936 he was adopted as Liberal prospective parliamentary candidate by Salisbury Liberal Association. Even though the Liberals had not contested the seat in 1935 they were thought to be the main challenger to the Conservatives. He was a supporter of a Popular Front advocated by Sir Stafford Cripps which urged electoral co-operation between the Liberal and Labour parties. With a general election expected for the Autumn of 1939, he had hopes of persuading the Labour party in Salisbury to allow him a free-run at the Conservative candidate. Due to the outbreak of war, the election did not take place. He was Liberal candidate for the Salisbury Division of Wiltshire at the 1945 General Election. He had to fly back from active service in Sri Lanka to fight the election campaign.

He was Liberal candidate again for the Salisbury Division of Wiltshire at the 1950 General Election.

Awards and honours
He was awarded the OBE in 1946. He was awarded the Officer of US Legion of Merit in 1947.

References

Works by Alan Campbell-Johnson: Anthony Eden, a biography (1938); Viscount Halifax, a biography (1941); Mission with Mountbatten (1951); Mountbatten in Retrospect (1997)

1913 births
1998 deaths
Alumni of Christ Church, Oxford
Foreign recipients of the Legion of Merit
Liberal Party (UK) parliamentary candidates
Companions of the Order of the Indian Empire
Officers of the Order of the British Empire
People educated at Westminster School, London
British people in colonial India
Royal Air Force wing commanders
Royal Air Force Volunteer Reserve personnel of World War II
British public relations people